This is a list of the Italy national football team results from 1950 to 1969. During this period, Italy achieved first place at UEFA Euro 1968.

Results

1950

1951

1952

1953

1954

1955

1956

1957

1958

1959

1960

1961

1962

1963

1964

1965

1966

1967

1968

1969

1Indicates new coach / Technical Commission

External links
Italy - International Matches 1950-1959 on RSSSF.com
Italy - International Matches 1960-1969 on RSSSF.com

1950s in Italy
1960s in Italy
Italy national football team results